The 6th Goya Awards were presented in Madrid, Spain on 7 March 1992.

Amantes won the award for Best Film.

Winners and nominees

Major award nominees

Other award nominees

Honorary Goya
 Emiliano Piedra

06
1991 film awards
1991 in Spanish cinema